Marius Bildøy (born 29 March 2000) is a Norwegian footballer who plays as a forward for Lysekloster.

He made his professional debut when he replaced Kasper Skaanes in the First Round of 2017 Norwegian Football Cup. His league debut came in the last game of the year, when he replaced Ludcinio Marengo against Tromsø IL.

In March 2019, he signed for Åsane Fotball on a season-long loan deal. The loan was terminated in the summer. In February 2020, Bildøy signed for 3. divisjon team Lysekloster.

Career statistics

References

External links

2000 births
Living people
Association football forwards
Norwegian footballers
SK Brann players
Åsane Fotball players
Eliteserien players
Norwegian Second Division players
Norway youth international footballers